Saint-Jean is a provincial electoral district in the Montérégie region of the province of Quebec. It comprises most of Saint-Jean-sur-Richelieu and all of Saint-Blaise-sur-Richelieu.

It was created for the 1867 election (and an electoral district of that name existed earlier in the Legislative Assembly of the Province of Canada).  It disappeared in the 1939 election and its successor electoral district was Saint-Jean–Napierville; however, it was re-created for the 1944 election.

In the change from the 2001 to the 2011 electoral map, its territory was unchanged.

In the 1994 election (on September 12) there was a tie between incumbent Liberal candidate Michel Charbonneau and PQ candidate Roger Paquin. A new election was held on October 24 and was won by Paquin by a margin of 532 votes.

Bellwether district

The Saint-Jean district had been for a long time considered a reliable bellwether district. From 1897 to 1936, from 1944 to 2007, in 2012 and 2018, the Saint-Jean district elected a member of the governing party.

In 1994, the Saint-Jean district received high media coverage following the September 12 general election. As a consequence of a tie in the number of votes between Michel Charbonneau (PLQ) and Roger Paquin (PQ), no candidate is declared a winner.
This unique situation in the history of Quebec politics necessitates a new district election that took place on October 24, 1994. The victory of the PQ candidate strengthens the perception that Saint-Jean is a bellwether district, for two reasons: the initial tie in the votes reflects, according to some commentators, the weak majority by the PQ over the liberals that were obtained provincially in the general election. Secondly, the victory of Paquin confirms that, once again, voters in Saint-Jean tend to vote for the party forming the government.

Even though Saint-Jean voters, since 2007, have selected some candidates forming the opposition party, the media sometimes still refer to it as a bellwether district.

Other provincial districts that are sometimes considered as bellwether include Terrebonne (Lanaudière), Trois-Rivières (Mauricie), and Chauveau (Capitale-Nationale).

The federal electoral district of Saint-Jean, which includes parts of the provincial Saint-Jean and Iberville districts, is also sometimes cited as a bellwether.

Members of the Legislative Assembly / National Assembly

Election results

Reference for 2014 results:

^ Change CAQ change is from ADQ
Reference for 2012 results:

 
|Liberal
|Jean-Pierre Paquin
|align="right"|12,568
|align="right"|36.52
|align="right"| +11.64

|Independent
|Guillaume Tremblay
|align="right"|118
|align="right"|0.34
|align="right"| -3.29

|-
 
|Liberal
|Jean-Pierre Paquin
|align="right"|10,131
|align="right"|24.88
|align="right"| -15.87

|}

References

External links
Information
 Elections Quebec

Election results
 Election results (National Assembly)

Maps
 2011 map (PDF)
 2001 map (Flash)
2001–2011 changes (Flash)
1992–2001 changes (Flash)
 Electoral map of Montérégie region
 Quebec electoral map, 2011 

Quebec provincial electoral districts
Saint-Jean-sur-Richelieu